An autophagosome is a spherical structure with double layer membranes. It is the key structure in macroautophagy, the intracellular degradation system for cytoplasmic contents (e.g., abnormal intracellular proteins, excess or damaged organelles, invading microorganisms). After formation, autophagosomes deliver cytoplasmic components to the lysosomes. The outer membrane of an autophagosome fuses with a lysosome to form an autolysosome. The lysosome's hydrolases degrade the autophagosome-delivered contents and its inner membrane.

The formation of autophagosomes is regulated by genes that are well-conserved from yeast to higher eukaryotes. The nomenclature of these genes has differed from paper to paper, but it has been simplified in recent years. The gene families formerly known as APG, AUT, CVT, GSA, PAZ, and PDD are now unified as the ATG (AuTophaGy related) family.

The size of autophagosomes vary  between mammals and yeast. Yeast autophagosomes are about 500-900 nm, while mammalian autophagosomes are larger (500-1500 nm). In some examples of cells, like embryonic stem cells, embryonic fibroblasts, and hepatocytes, autophagosomes are visible with light microscopy and can be seen as ring-shaped structures.

Autophagosome formation 

The initial step of autophagosome formation of an omegasome on the endoplasmic reticulum, followed by of elongation of structures called phagophores.

The formation of autophagosomes is controlled by Atg genes through Atg12-Atg5 and LC3 complexes. The conjugate of Atg12-Atg5 also interacts with Atg16 to form larger complexes. Modification of Atg5 by Atg12 is essential for the elongation of the initial membrane.

After the formation of the spherical structure, the complex of ATG12-ATG5:ATG16L1 dissociates from the autophagosome. LC3 is cleaved by ATG4 protease to generate cytosolic LC3. LC3 cleavage is required for the terminal fusion of an autophagosome with its target membrane. LC3 is commonly used as a marker of autophagosomes in immunocytochemistry, because it is the essential part of the vesicle and stays associated until the last moment before its fusion. At first, autophagosomes fuse with endosomes or endosome-derived vesicles. These structures are then called amphisomes or intermediate autophagic vacuoles.   Nonetheless, these structures contain endocytic markers even small lysosomal proteins such as cathepsin D.

The process is similar in yeast, however the gene names differ. For example, LC3 in mammals is Atg8 in yeast and autophagosomes are generated from Pre-Autophagosomal Structure (PAS) which is distinct from the precursor structures in mammalian cells. The pre-autophagosomal structure in yeast is described as a complex localized near the vacuole. However the significance of this localization is not known. Mature yeast autophagosomes fuse directly with vacuoles or lysosomes and do not form amphisomes as in mammals.

In yeast autophagosome maturation, there are also other known players as Atg1, Atg13 and Atg17. Atg1 is a kinase upregulated upon induction of autophagy. Atg13 regulates Atg1 and together they form a complex called Atg13:Atg1, which receives signals from the master of nutrient sensing – Tor. Atg1 is also important in late stages of autophagosome formation.

Function in neurons 

In neurons, autophagosomes are generated at the neurite tip and mature (acidify) as they travel towards the cell body along the axon. This axonal transport is disrupted if huntingtin or its interacting partner HAP1, which colocalize with autophagosomes in neurons, are depleted.

References 

Cell biology